Camilla Johansson (born January 9, 1974) is a former Swedish Olympic backstroke swimmer. She competed in the 2000 Summer Olympics, where she finished 10th in the 4×100 m medley relay team and 31st in the 100 m backstroke. Her married name is Camilla Johansson-Sponseller. She now swims for the Sun Devils Masters in Tempe, Arizona.

She lives in Tuscaloosa, AL with her husband, two children and a great dane named Hector.

Clubs
Trelleborgs SS
Växjö SS

References

1974 births
Living people
Swimmers at the 2000 Summer Olympics
Olympic swimmers of Sweden
Trelleborgs SS swimmers
Swedish female backstroke swimmers